Hakim Ouro-Sama (born 28 December 1997) is a Togolese professional footballer who plays as a centre-back for French club Lille reserve team, which plays in Championnat National 3, and the Togo national team.

Club career
On 4 July 2018, Ouro-Sama joined French Ligue 1 club Lille on five-year deal. In the summer 2019, Ouro-Sama was loaned out to Portuguese club Belenenses SAD for the rest of the season. However, Ouro-Sama played only 52 minutes in the Primeira Liga and four games for the U23 team, before he was recalled on 6 February 2020.

On 7 December 2021, Ouro-Sama was loaned to Bastia-Borgo.

International career
Ouro-Sama represented the Togo under-20 side in the 2015 Orange African U-20 Cup of Nations in all four of their qualifying games against Morocco and Mali in 2014

He played his first game for Togo on 4 October 2016 in a friendly against Uganda and was selected for the nation's squad for the 2017 Africa Cup of Nations.

International goals
Scores and results list the Togo's goal tally first.

References

External links
BDFutbol Profile

1997 births
Living people
People from Maritime Region
Togolese footballers
Togo international footballers
Togolese expatriate footballers
Association football central defenders
2017 Africa Cup of Nations players
AS Togo-Port players
Lille OSC players
Belenenses SAD players
FC Bastia-Borgo players
Championnat National 2 players
Primeira Liga players
Championnat National 3 players
Championnat National players
Expatriate footballers in France
Expatriate footballers in Portugal
Togolese expatriate sportspeople in France
Togolese expatriate sportspeople in Portugal
21st-century Togolese people